Antin Kravs (23 November 1871 – 13 November 1945) was a Ukrainian general who was most notable for commanding the 3rd Corps in the Polish-Ukrainian War.

Biography
He was born on 23 November 1871, in the village of Berehomet in the family of German origin. His mother is Ukrainian.

On 1 September 1891, after graduating from the Infantry Cadet School in Vienna, he was appointed a cadet-deputy officer and incorporated into the Hungarian Infantry Regiment No. 67 in Prešov. It was only after five years (1 November 1895) that he was promoted to second lieutenant, and after another four years to lieutenant on 1 November 1899. While still serving in the Hungarian Infantry Regiment No. 67, on 1 November 1909, he was promoted to captain. In 1911 he was transferred to the Galician Infantry Regiment No. 58 in Stanisławów. In the years 1912–1913, he took part in the mobilization of the armed forces of the Austro-Hungarian Monarchy, introduced in connection with the Balkan Wars.

During the First World War, he was the commander of the 58th Stanislavivsky Regiment and the 55th Brzezany Regiment on the Russian and Italian fronts. Kravs was promoted to Major and later on, Lieutenant Colonel within the Austro-Hungarian Army.

From December 1918, he would serve in the Ukrainian Galician Army and was the active commander of the battle group "Khirov" of the 8th Sambir Brigade of the 3rd Corps of the UGA in the Polish-Ukrainian War. In the spring of 1919, just before the introduction of the Dictatorship of the Western Ukrainian People's Republic, the military circles of the Galician Army proposed appointing Kravs as Dictator since he was an experienced general and Yevhen Petrushevych had no military knowledge. In August 1919 he was commander of the III army group in the Kiev Offensive operation of both GA and the Active Armies, with which he occupied Kyiv on August 30 and held it until August 31, 1919 (he was forced to leave the capital due to misunderstandings in orders). with the Chief Ataman of the UPR Petliura).

In the autumn of 1919 he was commander of the 3rd Corps on the Bolshevik and Denikin fronts. In 1920, he was commander of the Chuga Brigade, joined the Army of the Ukrainian People's Republic, commander of the group that in August 1920 broke through (through Pokuttya and the Carpathians) to Czechoslovakia, was in the camps of interned UGA units in Liberec. From 1924 in Vienna, Kravs was an activist of UGA veterans' societies, author of memoirs "For the Ukrainian cause." In 1941 he became a member of the Ukrainian General Council of Combatants.

He died on 13 November 1945, in Vienna and buried in Vienna at the Kalksburg Cemetery (grave location: Gruppe 9 Nummer 19).

Legacy
General Kravs is depicted in the film . However, according to Kyiv historian Andriy Rukkas, his figure is depicted incorrectly as his surname is distorted to Krevs. The film also presents both false information about the military unit with which Kravs allegedly dealt in the Carpathians, and the absurdity about the incomprehensible solitary travels and meetings with Petliura.

Works
A. Kravs For the Ukrainian cause. Memories of III. U.G.A. after crossing Zbruch. – Lviv: Publishing Cooperative "Red Viburnum", 1937. – 100 p.

Notes

References

Bibliography
 
 
 
 
 
 
 
 
 
 Kravs Antin in: Encyclopedia of the History of Ukraine: Vol. 5. Editor: VA Smoliy (chairman) and others. NAS of Ukraine. Institute of History of Ukraine. – Kyiv 2008, Ed. "Scientific thought". .
 Encyclopedia of Ukraine
 Kravs Antin // Довідник з історії України — 2-ге вид. — К., 2001. — pp. 362–363.
 Kovalenko Sergey. Kravs Antin / Black Cossacks: the history of the regiment. 2nd edition.   – Kyiv: Stix Publishing House, 2015.   – 368 p.
  Naumenko K. Ye . Kravs Antin
 Hussar. Yu. General-Chetar from Beregomet / Yuhym Gsar // Nimchych, 2016.   – P.105.

1871 births
1945 deaths
Austro-Hungarian military personnel of World War I
People from the Duchy of Bukovina
People of the Polish–Soviet War
Ukrainian Austro-Hungarians
Ukrainian Galician Army people
Ukrainian people of World War I
Ukrainian people of German descent
Ukrainian people of the Polish–Ukrainian War
West Ukrainian People's Republic people